The TT-01 is a 1/10 scale shaft-driven R/C chassis made by Tamiya. Since its release in 2003, the TT-01 has become a very popular entry-level chassis, especially for drifting and rallying applications. The bathtub chassis frame combined with the central driveshaft makes it a durable car for everyday surfaces, and its relatively light weight plastic chassis and cut-out mounting positions for the battery and motor gives it a low center of gravity. Both in Europe and the US the TT-01 is the de facto choice for 24-hour endurance races. These events see teams of competitors, hobbyists, and friends build their TT-01 kit at the track the morning of the race then compete for 24 hours with teams of 5-8 people just like the races at Lemans and Daytona. Tamiya's recent addition of LED lights in most of their TT-01 kits sees these races take on an even more realistic look as the cars sport head and tail lights at night.

Versions 
 TT-01 - The first Tamiya TT-01 was released as a Ferrari Enzo in 2003. The original version features a 27T 540 "silver-can" motor, open planetary differentials front and rear, and non-adjustable double wishbone suspension with dry friction shock absorbers.
 TT-01D (Drift) - Includes low friction, hard plastic "drift" tires, ball bearings, adjustable suspension arms, oil-filled shock absorbers and a Sport Tuned 25T Mabuchi Motor. It also comes with body shells of typical real-life drift cars like the Mazda FD3S RX-7, Nissan Silvia S15 Nismo Coppermix and Toyota Supra, and the kits include LED lights.
 The TT-01R (Race) - Adds aluminum alloy drive shaft, adjustable rear toe-in and a Tamiya 25T "GT tuned" motor. The race kit does not come with a lexan body shell.
 TT-01E (Enhanced) - The standard TT-01 model upgraded with polycarbonate suspension uprights and fibreglass-reinforced nylon upper deck/chassis bracing and motor mount, thus improving both the structural rigidity and the toughness of the vehicle. For more information on the updated parts check this information from tamiya: TT01 vs. TT01 E By Andrew Kuntze
 TT-01D Type E - Combines "D" upgraded parts with "E" upgraded materials.
 TT-01R Type E - Combines "R" upgraded parts with "E" upgraded materials.  Also adds metal diff cup joints, dog bones and wheel axles.
 TT-01ES (TT-01E Sport) - XB Series/RTR-only version of the TT01E kit.  Uses cheaper materials to achieve lower retail price.

Expert built 
Tamiya also sells the TT-01, TT-01D and TT-01E in Ready-to-Run (RTR) versions, designated "XB" or "Expert built". These come with pre-painted body shells, transmitters and receivers, and only needs batteries and a charger to get the model going.

Depending on your country XB System RTR kits are also available. These ship with a simple wall plug charger and a standard size 7.2V 1800mah NiMH battery.

24 Hours of Andernach (Germany)
The 24 Hours of Andernach (24h Rennen Andernach in German) is an endurance RC race that takes place once a year at the Andernach Autodrom in Germany.  Uwe Rheinard, co-creator of the Euro Touring Series and father of Marc, four times IFMAR World Champion driver, started his annual 24-hour endurance-race event originally using Tamiya FWD kits.  Since its introduction, the TT01 kit has been utilized.  RC Racers around the world see this race as the biggest RC endurance race and many races in other countries are modeled after it.  All teams utilize a Porsche 911 body.  Since the event is held outdoors, the teams must be prepared for rain just like the real thing, because they do not stop the race for weather.  In 2012, Conrad Electronic supported the event with 4000 mAh LiPo batteries. Rules allow a maximum of five battery packs.
With 3482 laps, or 630 km, team ‘Wilde 13′ won for the fourth time in row with their Falken-Porsche using only two sets of tires and without a single parts failure.

24 Hours of Jackson (USA)
Inspired by Andernach, RC racers in the US caught onto the fun of endurance racing with the TT-01, most notably with the creation of the 24 Hours of Jackson held in Jackson, New Jersey. The race is promoted courtesy of the Jackson RC club, who are also known for hosting the 2011 ROAR National RC Championships. They held their 1st annual event in 2010 with great success seeing almost all teams finish the race.  The facility is also an outdoor, curbed, euro-style track which is ideal for endurance racing as it cuts down on marshal needs which adds up over 24 hours.  Many teams will find a motor change needed at some point in the race which again makes the TT-01 an ideal platform with its shaft drive making the change quick and painless.  The race allows teams of 5-8 people and, unlike Andernach, the ability to choose their body of choice from 6-8 available selections that are in stock from Tamiya. Jackson also came to the decision in keeping the track layout the same for this particular race so subsequent years could attempt to break the distance record.  This was to be the case with the winning team in 2010 covering 3963 laps only to be broken by the 2011 winner who managed 4118 laps total.

See also
Tamiya DF-02
Tamiya TT-02

References

External links
 Tamiya TT-01 conversion kit
 Red RC Report from Andernach 2012

TT-01